was a Japanese football player and manager.

Playing career
Hitoshi Okino played for Hiroshima Fujita SC in Japanese Prefectural Leagues and Japanese Regional Leagues from 1981 to 1991.

Coaching career
Since 2001, Hitoshi Okino became coach and staff for some J.League club; Shonan Bellmare (2001-2004), Kawasaki Frontale (2005), Avispa Fukuoka (2006-2007). In December 2006, when he was assistant coach for Avispa Fukuoka under manager; Ryoichi Kawakatsu, Kawakatsu resigned manager. So he managed club for Emperor's Cup as caretaker.

Death
On September 10, 2009, when he was staff for Japan Football League club; FC Machida Zelvia, he collapsed during training and he died on September 11 (Myocardial infarction, aged 50).

References

External links

1959 births
2009 deaths
Meiji University alumni
Association football people from Hiroshima Prefecture
Japanese footballers
Japanese football managers
Avispa Fukuoka managers
Association footballers not categorized by position